The bombing of Ludwigshafen and Oppau in World War II attacked several strategic targets in the area, including targets of the Oil Campaign of World War II.  Ludwigshafen oil plants were managed by Dr. Wurster of the Ludwigshafen Military Government, and their chief function was to improve "gasoline quality by dehydrogenation" using the DHD process.  Ludwigshafen also refined "30-50 tons/day of crude oil...brought in from Brücksel, near Karlsruhe...to products including lube oils."  About 2.5 miles away from Ludwigshafen, an Oppau plant produced fertilizer and up to "800 T/day nitrogen as ammonia and a considerable part of this was exported as liquid ammonia to Hochst, Wolfen and Bittefeld."  A separate Oppau plant produced up to 60 T/day of urea.  Dr. Gogel was head of the "high pressure department" at Oppau.  After visiting the Ludwigshafen and Oppau factories from March 25–31 and 27–30 May, in August 1946, a post-war team published the Report On Investigations by Fuels and Lubricants Teams At The I.G. Farbenindustrie, A. G., Works, Ludwigshafen and Oppau.

References

Oil campaign of World War II
L